"Unforgettable" is a popular song written by Irving Gordon. The song's original working title was "Uncomparable"; however, the music publishing company asked Gordon to change it to "Unforgettable". The song was published in 1951.

Nat King Cole version
The most popular version of the song was recorded by Nat King Cole in 1951 from his album Unforgettable (1952), with an arrangement written by Nelson Riddle. A non-orchestrated version of the song recorded in 1952 is featured as one of the seven bonus tracks on Cole's 1998 CD reissue of 1955's otherwise completely instrumental album, Penthouse Serenade. On March 30, 1961, Nat King Cole recorded the tune anew in a stereo version (with Ralph Carmichael and his Orchestra) of the Riddle arrangement, for the album The Nat King Cole Story (1961).

In 1991, after Elvis Presley's musical director Joe Guercio had the idea, Cole's original 1951 recording of the song was edited and reworked to create a duet with his daughter, Natalie. The remixed version reached number 14 on the Hot 100, matching the peak position of the original version on the Billboard Best-Selling Pop Singles chart, and also number three on the Billboard Adult Contemporary chart.  The song also won three awards at the 34th Annual Grammy Awards (1992): Song of the Year, Record of the Year and Best Traditional Pop Vocal Performance.

Nat Cole's original recording was inducted into the Grammy Hall of Fame in 2000.

Chart history

Natalie Cole and Nat King Cole version

American singer Natalie Cole included a cover of the song on her album Unforgettable... with Love (1991). The song, reworked as a "virtual duet" with her father, Nat King Cole, reached number three on the US Billboard Adult Contemporary chart, number one on the Canadian RPM Adult Contemporary chart, and number two on the Australian Singles Chart. The performance of the song at the 1992 Grammy Awards was released on the 1994 album Grammy's Greatest Moments Volume I.

Critical reception
Billboard commented, "Through the magic of digital technology father and daughter duet on this timeless song that swells with lush orchestration and moving harmonies."

Charts

Weekly charts

Year-end charts

Certifications and sales

Other cover versions
Semprini with Rhythm Acc. recorded it in London on March 26, 1952, as the third melody of the medley "Dancing to the piano (No. 14) - Part 1. Hit Medley of Foxtrots" along with "Slow Coach" and "Cry". It was released by EMI on the His Master's Voice label as catalog number B 10263.

Other cover versions were performed or recorded by:

Sampled by song
Nas on "Can't Forget About You" (2006)

References 

1950s jazz standards
1951 songs
1991 singles
Capitol Records singles
Elektra Records singles
Nat King Cole songs
Natalie Cole songs
Grammy Award for Record of the Year
Grammy Award for Song of the Year
Grammy Award for Best Instrumental Arrangement Accompanying Vocalist(s)
Grammy Award for Best Traditional Pop Vocal Album
Sia (musician) songs
Song recordings produced by David Foster
Songs written by Irving Gordon
Music published by Bourne Co. Music Publishers
Pixar songs
Pop standards
Walt Disney Records singles